John Thornley Finney (born 1 May 1932) was the eighth Suffragan Bishop of Pontefract.

He was educated at Charterhouse and Hertford College, Oxford. Ordained in 1958, he began his career with curacies in Headington and Aylesbury and was then successively Rector of Tollerton,  Vicar of St Margarets Aspley Adviser in Evangelism to the Bishop of Southwell and Nottingham and then Officer for the Decade of Evangelism before  ascending to the Episcopate – a post he held from 1993 until 1998. An eminent author, in retirement he continues to minister, as an honorary assistant bishop within the Diocese of Southwell and Nottingham.

References

1932 births
People educated at Charterhouse School
Alumni of Hertford College, Oxford
Bishops of Pontefract
20th-century Church of England bishops
Living people